Magnesium trisilicate is an inorganic compound that is used as a food additive. The additive is frequently used by fast food chains to absorb fatty acids and extract impurities formed while frying edible oils. It has good acid neutralizing properties, but the reaction appears too slow to serve as an effective non-prescription antacid.

Health effects

On March 12, 2007, Chinese health authorities halted the use of magnesium trisilicate at Shaanxi Province KFC franchises, suspecting it to be a possible carcinogen.  As a response, China's Ministry of Health conducted tests at six outlets of KFC.  The results showed chemicals in the cooking process at KFC restaurants in the country were not harmful. The Ministry of Health said tests showed that using the product to filter cooking oil had no apparent impact on health. Food scares regularly sweep the Chinese media.

References

Food additives
Silicates
Magnesium compounds